Marzi may refer to:

People
Andrea Marzi, German-American virologist 
Franca Marzi (1926–1989), Italian film actress
 Giulio Marzi (1647–1718), Roman Catholic prelate
 Gustavo Marzi (1908–1966), Italian fencer
 Mario Marzi (born 1964), Italian saxophonist
 Marzi Pestonji, Indian dancer and choreographer

Places
 Marzi, Calabria, town in the province of Cosenza in southern Italy

Other
 Marzi (serial), Pakistani drama serial that first aired on Geo Tv on 14 July 2016
 Marzi (web series), Indian Web Series streaming on OTT platform Voot
 Marzi: A Memoir, a French graphic novel series